Selenium dibromide is a compound made of one selenium and two bromine atoms. It is unstable. No solid form of the compound has been discovered but it is a component of the equilibria in the vapour above selenium tetrabromide and in nonaqueous solutions. This covalent compound has a bent molecular geometry in the gas phase.

References

Bromides
Selenium(II) compounds